The Government of the 1st Dáil was the executive of the unilaterally declared Irish Republic. At the 1918 Westminster election, candidates for Sinn Féin stood on an abstentionist platform, declaring that they would not remain in the Parliament of the United Kingdom but instead form a unicameral, revolutionary parliament for Ireland called Dáil Éireann.

The first meeting of the First Dáil was held on 21 January 1919 in the Round Room of the Mansion House in Dublin and made a Declaration of Independence. It also approved the Dáil Constitution. Under Article 2 of this Constitution, there would be a Ministry of Dáil Éireann led by a President, with five Secretaries leading government departments. There were two Ministries of Dáil Éireann during the First Dáil. The 1st Ministry (22 January to 1 April 1919) was led by Cathal Brugha and lasted for 69 days; it was formed when a large number of those elected for Sinn Féin were in prison. The 2nd Ministry (1 April 1919 to 26 August 1921) was led by Éamon de Valera, leader of Sinn Féin, and lasted for 878 days.

1st Ministry

The 1st Ministry was a temporary cabinet headed by Cathal Brugha, because Éamon de Valera, the leader of Sinn Féin, was in prison at the time.

2nd Ministry

On 1 April, the 1st Ministry resigned. On a motion proposed by Cathal Brugha and seconded by Pádraic Ó Máille, Éamon de Valera was declared elected as President of Dáil Éireann. The Constitution was amended to allow for up to nine members of the Ministry, as well as the President. The following day, he formed the 2nd Ministry. Countess Markievicz became the first Irish female Cabinet minister. She served until 26 August 1921, and the next woman appointed to cabinet was Máire Geoghegan-Quinn, who was appointed as Minister for the Gaeltacht in 1979.

De Valera travelled to the United States in June 1919, and by letter requested that Arthur Griffith be appointed as Deputy President in his absence and that Ernest Blythe take a place at cabinet. De Valera resumed his position in the Dáil on 25 January 1921.

Resignation of Ministry
In May 1921, the Dáil passed a resolution declaring that elections to the House of Commons of Northern Ireland and the House of Commons of Southern Ireland would be used as the election for the Second Dáil.

The members of the 2nd Dáil first met on 16 August 1921. The outgoing Ministry did not resign immediately. On 26 August 1921, Éamon de Valera resigned as president. De Valera was then re-elected, taking the new title of President of the Republic, and formed the 3rd Ministry of Dáil Éireann.

See also
Dáil Éireann
Government of Ireland
Politics of the Republic of Ireland
1918 United Kingdom general election

References

1st Dáil
Government 01
1918 establishments in Ireland
1919 disestablishments in Ireland
Cabinets established in 1918
Cabinets disestablished in 1919